The 13th Independent Spirit Awards, honoring the best in independent filmmaking for 1997, were announced on March 21, 1998.  It was hosted by John Turturro.

Nominees and winners
{| class="wikitable"
!Best Feature
!Best Director
|-
|The Apostle

Chasing Amy
Loved
Ulee's Gold
Waiting for Guffman
|Robert Duvall – The Apostle

Larry Fessenden – Habit
Victor Nuñez – Ulee's Gold
Paul Schrader – Touch
Wim Wenders – The End of Violence
|-
!Best Male Lead
!Best Female Lead
|-
|Robert Duvall – The Apostle

Peter Fonda – Ulee's Gold
Christopher Guest – Waiting for Guffman
Philip Baker Hall – Hard Eight
John Turturro – Box of Moonlight
|Julie Christie – Afterglow

Stacy Edwards – In the Company of Men
Alison Folland – All Over Me
Lisa Harrow – Sunday
Robin Wright Penn – Loved
|-
!Best Supporting Male
!Best Supporting Female
|-
|Jason Lee – Chasing Amy

Efrain Figueroa – Star Maps
Samuel L. Jackson – Hard Eight
Ajay Naidu – SubUrbia
Roy Scheider – The Myth of Fingerprints
|Debbi Morgan – Eve's Bayou

Farrah Fawcett – The Apostle
Amy Madigan – Loved
Miranda Richardson – The Apostle
Patricia Richardson – Ulee's Gold
|-
!Best Screenplay
!Best First Screenplay
|-
|Chasing Amy – Kevin SmithThe Apostle – Robert Duvall
Touch – Paul Schrader
Ulee's Gold – Victor Nuñez
Waiting for Guffman – Christopher Guest and Eugene Levy
|In the Company of Men – Neil LaButeThe Bible and Gun Club – Daniel J. Harris
Critical Care – Steven Schwartz
Hard Eight – Paul Thomas Anderson
Star Maps – Miguel Arteta
|-
!Best First Feature
!Best Debut Performance
|-
|Eve's Bayou

The Bible and Gun Club
Hard Eight
In the Company of Men
Star Maps
|Aaron Eckhart – In the Company of Men

Tyrone Burton, Eddie Cutanda and Phuong Duong – Squeeze
Lysa Flores – Star Maps
Darling Narita – Bang
Douglas Spain – Star Maps
|-
!Best Cinematography
!Best International Film
|-
|Kama Sutra: A Tale of Love – Declan QuinnThe Bible and Gun Club – Alex Vendler
Habit – Frank G. DeMarco
Hard Eight – Robert Elswit
Sunday – Michael F. Barrow and John Foster
|The Sweet Hereafter • CanadaHappy Together • Hong Kong
Mouth to Mouth • Spain
Nenette and Boni • France
Underground • Yugoslavia/France/Germany
|}

 Films that received multiple nominations 

 Films that won multiple awards 

Special awards

Truer Than Fiction AwardFast, Cheap & Out of Control
Colors Straight Up
Family Name
Sick: The Life & Death of Bob Flanagan, Supermasochist
Soul in the Hole

Producers Award
Scott Macauley and Robin O'Hara – Habit
Margot Bridger – Arresting Gena & The Delta
Lisa Onodera – Picture Bride & Forbidden City U.S.A.
Richard Raddon – Shooting Lilly & The Making of '...And God SpokeSusan A. Stover – High Art & River of Grass

Someone to Watch AwardScott Saunders – The Headhunter's Sister'''Erin Dignam – LovedTim Blake Nelson – Eye of God''

External links 
1997 Spirit Awards at IMDb

References

1997
Independent Spirit Awards